A referendum on sales tax was held by postal ballot in British Columbia from June 13 to August 5, 2011, though Canada Post workers were locked out until June 27. Voters were asked whether the Harmonized Sales Tax should be retained or split back to the original Provincial Sales Tax (PST) and Goods & Services Tax (GST). If the majority of voters voted "Yes" to extinguish the HST, 7% PST would be reinstated and the combined tax rate would remain at 12%.  If the majority of voters voted "No", the BC government would reduce the HST rate to 11% in 2012 and 10% in 2014.

The yes side passed with 54.73%.

Question

Results

External links
2011 HST Referendum Voting Results (results start on page 34)

British Columbia sales tax referendum
British Columbia sales tax referendum
Referendums in British Columbia
Sales tax referendum
British Columbia sales tax referendum
British Columbia sales tax referendum
British Columbia sales tax referendum